Pot marjoram is a common name for a number of species of Origanum used as herbs, including:

 Origanum onites, found in Sicily, Greece, and Turkey
 Origanum majorana, often just called marjoram